The Players Tour Championship 2010/2011 – Event 4 (also known as Star Xing Pai Players Tour Championship 2010/2011 – Event 4 for sponsorship purposes) was a professional minor-ranking snooker tournament that took place between 14 and 16 August 2010 at the World Snooker Academy in Sheffield, England. The preliminary rounds took place on 25 July at the same venue.

Barry Pinches won in the final 4–3 against Ronnie O'Sullivan.

Prize fund and ranking points
The breakdown of prize money and ranking points of the event is shown below:

1 Only professional players can earn ranking points.

Main draw

Preliminary rounds

Round 1
Best of 7 frames

Round 2
Best of 7 frames

Main rounds

Top half

Section 1

Section 2

Section 3

Section 4

Bottom half

Section 5

Section 6

Section 7

Section 8

Finals

Final

Century breaks

 140  Rory McLeod
 137, 109, 104  Marco Fu
 136, 116, 113, 108  Ronnie O'Sullivan
 135  Joe Perry
 134, 105  Barry Pinches
 129, 124  Andy Hicks
 129  Mark Selby
 128, 125  Liu Song
 124, 109  Matthew Stevens
 124, 107  Mark Davis
 121  Stuart Pettman
 119  Gerard Greene
 116  Barry Hawkins
 113, 111  Tony Drago
 113  Jamie Walker

 110, 105  Alfie Burden
 109  Michael Holt
 108  Daniel Wells
 107  David Gilbert
 106  Dominic Dale
 104  Graeme Dott
 103  Chris Norbury
 102  Ian Glover
 102  Stephen Maguire
 102  Stephen Lee
 101  Xiao Guodong
 100  Jamie O'Neill
 100  Matthew Selt
 100  Robert Milkins

Notes

 Jimmy White withdrew due to ill health.

References

4
2010 in English sport

sv:Players Tour Championship 2010/2011#Players Tour Championship 4